Simin Ghanem (Persian: سیمین غانم‌, born 11 April 1944, Tonekabon, Iran) is an Iranian classical and pop singer. She is best known for her song "Gole Goldun".A remix of Sib's song was made by Odesza music group "Behind the Sun", which was used in the FIFA 23 game and also in the opening credits of Apple's WWDC22 conference.

Career
Ghanem started singing when she was 9 years old. In 1962, she was the best singer in the Iranian school competition. 7 years later she started her professional singing career with the TV program Moje Khorooshan.

She studied traditional Iranian music with Morteza Hannaneh & Ali Tajvidi, both professional musicians in Iran. Her first song in this style was : Gollake Cheshat (قلک چشات). For many years it was the most popular song in Iran. Her Most famous song is Gole Goldoon (گل گلدون).

The American electronic music duo Odesza used samples of Ghanem's song Sib on the track Behind the Sun from the album The Last Goodbye.

Discography
Her famous songs are:
Gole Goldoon, compositeur; Fariborz Lachini
Marde man
Parandeh
Gholake cheshat, Compositeur; Fariborz Lachini
Tore zolfant
Sib, Compositeur; Fariborz Lachini, Paroles; Farhad Shybani
Stash
Raghse baroon 
Dela

See also
Pari Zanganeh

References

External links
The official website

1944 births
20th-century Iranian women singers
Living people
Iranian composers
Persian classical musicians
People from Tonekabon
Women singers on Golha